Platelet-derived growth factor D is a protein that in humans is encoded by the PDGFD gene.

The protein encoded by this gene is a member of the platelet-derived growth factor family. The four members of this family are mitogenic factors for cells of mesenchymal origin and are characterized by a core motif of eight cysteines, seven of which are found in this factor. This gene product only forms homodimers and, therefore, does not dimerize with the other three family members. It differs from alpha and beta members of this family in having an unusual N-terminal domain, the CUB domain. Two splice variants have been identified for this gene.

References

Further reading